Grzegorz Radziwiłł  (1578–1613), fourth Grzegorz in Radziwiłł family,  was a Polish–Lithuanian noble (szlachcic), Castellan of Trakai in the Polish–Lithuanian Commonwealth.

1578 births
1613 deaths
Grzegorz (4th)
17th-century Polish people